Oconto may refer to:

Canada
Oconto, Ontario, a community in Central Frontenac township

United States
Oconto, Nebraska, a village
Oconto, Wisconsin, a city
Oconto (town), Wisconsin, adjacent to the city
Oconto County, Wisconsin
Oconto High School, in Oconto, Wisconsin
Oconto River, a river in Wisconsin

See also
Oconto Falls, Wisconsin, a city
Oconto Falls (town), Wisconsin, adjacent to the city
Oconto Falls High School, in Oconto Falls, Wisconsin